is a male former table tennis player from Japan.

Table tennis career
From 1967 to 1975 he won eight medals in singles, doubles, and team events in the World Table Tennis Championships and in the Asian Table Tennis Championships.

The eight medals included two gold medals in the men's singles at the 1969 World Table Tennis Championships and men's team event at the 1969 World Table Tennis Championships.

See also
 List of table tennis players
 List of World Table Tennis Championships medalists

References

External links
Shigeru Itoh (the third photograph from the top) / Ryokuseikai (Alumni Association of Senshu University Table Tennis Team 

Living people
Year of birth missing (living people)